is an apostolic constitution in the form of a papal bull promulgated by Pope Alexander VII in 1665 which required, according to the Enchiridion symbolorum, "all ecclesiastical personnel and teachers" to subscribe to an included formulary, the :

The constitution was requested by King Louis XIV of France.
In , Alexander VII required all clergy to reject and condemn the five propositions and the teachings of Jansen. It cited Innocent X's 1653 constitution  which condemned five propositions found in Cornelius Jansen's Augustinus as heretical. It also cited Alexander VII's 1656 constitution  which judged the meaning and intention of Jansen's words in Augustinus, and confirmed and renewed  promulgated by Innocent X in 1653.

See also

Formulary controversy

References

Apostolic constitutions
Documents of Pope Alexander VII
Jansenism
1665 works
17th-century papal bulls
Religion in the Ancien Régime
1665 in Christianity